John McCaskey may refer to:
 John G. McCaskey, American oil businessman
 John Piersol McCaskey, American educator, politician, and textbook and songbook editor